Helicopter Maritime Strike Squadron Five One (HSM-51) "WARLORDS" is a United States Navy helicopter squadron based at the Naval Air Facility Atsugi, Ayase City, Kanagawa Prefecture, Honshu, Japan. HSM-51is  one of the seven squadrons making up the Helicopter Maritime Strike Wing, Pacific Fleet, based out of San Diego which deploys aboard multiple ships in the U.S. Navy's Seventh Fleet that are based in Yokosuka, Japan.

Leadership
Commanding officer
CDR M. E. Kawika Chang

Executive officer
CDR Tommy McDonald

Command master chief
CMDCM (AW/SW/IW) T. Nguyen

Mission
The "Warlords" are the U.S. Navy's premiere forward-deployed Sikorsky MH-60R "Seahawk" helicopter squadron. Homeported in Naval Air Facility Atsugi, Japan, they provide combat-ready armed anti-surface and anti-submarine helicopter detachments to ships deploying in the Korean, Western Pacific and Persian Gulf regions, as well as Executive Transport for Commander, U.S. Seventh Fleet homeported in Yokosuka, Japan. They have recently transitioned from the old SH-60B helicopter to the new and improved MH-60R.

The MH-60R is an upgrade from the older SH-60B and carries a system of sensors including an airborne low-frequency sonar and air-launched sonobuoys. Other sensors include the APS-147 surface search radar, ALQ-144 electronic support measures (ESM) system and optional nose-mounted forward-looking infrared (FLIR) turret. It carries the Mk 46, Mk 50, or Mk 54 torpedo, AGM-114 Hellfire missile, and a single cabin-door-mounted M240  machine gun or GAU-21  machine gun.

Known as the "varsity squad", HSM-51 represents the elite squadron within the HSM community.

The squadron performs a diverse set of missions:

Primary missions include:
Anti-submarine warfare (ASW)
Anti-surface warfare (ASUW)

Secondary missions include:
Search and rescue (SAR)
Medical evacuation (MEDEVAC)
Vertical replenishment (VERTREP)
Special operations support (SPECOPS)
Naval Surface Fire Support (NSFS)
Communications Relay (COMREL)
Logistics support

History
HSL-51 was established on 3 October 1991 and transitioned to HSM-51 on 7 March 2013.

2011
On 11 March 2011, a 9.0-magnitude earthquake and resulting tsunami ravaged northeastern Japan. Responding immediately, HSL-51 surged two detachments within 24 hours and within three days had a total of five detachments deployed, operating independently and as a part of the Ronald Reagan Strike Group in direct support of Operation Tomodachi. In a first for the HSL/HSM community, the entire squadron redeployed from its home base of NAF Atsugi to NAF Misawa with less than 18 hours' notice. Three hundred and eighty-two hours and 118 sorties were flown delivering more than 100 tons of critical relief supplies.

In 2011, as a critical component of the Forward Deployed Naval Force's 9-1-1 response force, Warlord detachments surged nine times with less than 48 hours' notice, deploying directly into international events watched by the world and ensuring the security of U.S. and Allied interests across the Pacific. The year began with rising tensions on the Korean Peninsula and HSL-51 answering the call when needed most, rapidly deploying three detachments to the Yellow Sea. At the peak of the crisis and just days before Christmas Detachment FOUR embarked USS Shiloh (CG-67) in under 14 hours' notice providing Sea Surface Control (SSC) support to Seventh Fleet's Ballistic Missile Defense ships. In 2011, the Warlords executed over 5,891 SH-60B/F Class "A" mishap-free flight hours in support of CTF 70, CVW-5, eleven Yokosuka-based Cruiser-Destroyer ships, and one CONUS-based frigate. The Warlords also reached over 124,000 Class "A" mishap-free flight hours in 2011.

The meaning of Musashi
The WARLORDS embody the spirit and tenets of the samurai warrior depicted on their unit insignia, Miyamoto Musashi. A famed and accomplished 16th-century warrior, artist, sculptor, and calligrapher, Musashi was a master swordsman who created and perfected a two-sword kenjutsu technique called niten'ichi ("two heavens as one"). In this technique, the swordsman simultaneously uses both a large sword (katana) and a "companion sword" (wakazashi). In addition to his renowned skill as a swordsman, Musashi was also an expert in throwing weapons and was known for his straightforward approach to combat, with no additional frills or aesthetic considerations.

Squadron aircraft
UH-3H Sea King
VIP Configured UH-3H, 1991–2006

SH-60 Seahawk
SH-60B, 1991–2013
VIP Configured SH-60F, 2005–2013
MH-60R, 2013–present

References
1. All information here is verified through HSM-51's Public Affairs Officer.

External links  
HSM-51 Official website

See also

 History of the United States Navy
 List of United States Navy aircraft squadrons

Helicopter anti-submarine squadrons of the United States Navy